The Hi-Lo's were a vocal quartet formed in 1953, who achieved their greatest fame in the late 1950s and 1960s. The group's name is a reference to their extreme vocal and physical ranges (Bob Strasen and Bob Morse were tall, Gene Puerling and Clark Burroughs were short).

History
The group consisted of Gene Puerling (bass-baritone or fourth voice, arranger, leader, and occasional soloist), Bob Strasen (baritone or third voice), Bob Morse (baritone or second voice and frequent soloist) and Clark Burroughs (tenor or first voice/lead). In 1959, Bob Strasen left the group after he began losing his voice to unknown causes. After Strasen's departure, Bob Morse switched to the Baritone or third part, and tenor Don Shelton sang the second part.

They were occasionally supported by Frank Sinatra. Clare Fischer was their pianist for years and occasionally wrote arrangements for the group.

The Hi-Lo's recorded the theme song to the 1956 television series Noah's Ark. They were also featured on the soundtrack of the motion picture Everything's Ducky (1961), contributing three songs: "Everything's Ducky," "Moonlight Music" and "The Scuttlebutt Walk." They also made numerous appearances on television and had many live performances. The first group that had the Hi-Lo's name was a Barbershop quartet out of Wisconsin.  None of those original members were in Gene Puerling's group which started some years later, The Singers Unlimited.

Individual group members
In 1966, Puerling and Shelton along with Bonnie Herman and Len Dressler, formed another vocal group, The Singers Unlimited. This group gave a wide range for Puerling's arrangements, for the four singers multi-tracked as many as 16 voices. For that reason The Singers Unlimited were exclusively a recording group.

Bob Strasen died February 28, 1994, and Bob Morse on April 27, 2001. Afterward, Puerling, Shelton and Burroughs still appeared very occasionally as the Hi-Lo's in and around Southern California. Shelton is an accomplished reed player and has played in Clare Fischer's bands. Clark Burroughs is semi-retired and can sometimes be heard on film soundtracks.

On March 25, 2008, Gene Puerling died just before his 79th birthday.

Legacy
The Hi-Lo's and especially their innovative use of vocal harmony, were an influence on the groups and musicians Take 6, The King's Singers, The Manhattan Transfer, Chanticleer, The Free Design, Herbie Hancock, The Association, and Brian Wilson.

Discography
 Listen! (Starlite, 1954)
 I Presume (Starlite, 1955)
 On Hand (Starlite, 1956)
 Under Glass (Starlite, 1956)
 The Hi-Lo's and the Jerry Fielding Orchestra (Kapp, 1956)
 Ring Around Rosie with Rosemary Clooney (Columbia, 1957)
 Suddenly It's the Hi-Lo's (Columbia, 1957)
 Now Hear This (Columbia, 1957)
 Love Nest (Columbia, 1958)
 And All That Jazz (Columbia, 1958) with The Marty Paich Dek-Tette. This album was inducted into the Grammy Hall of Fame in 1998.
 Reflections in Rhythm with the Hi-Lo's! (Tiara Spotlight, 1958)
 The Hi-Lo's in Stereo (Omega Disk, 1959)
 All Over the Place (Columbia, 1960)
 Broadway Playbill (Columbia, 1960)
 This Time It's Love (Philips, 1961)
 Happen to Folk Songs with Billy May (Reprise, 1962)
 The Hi-Lo's Happen to Bossa Nova (Reprise, 1963)
 Back Again (MPS, 1979)
 Now (Pausa, 1981)
 Cherries and Other Delights (Hindsight, 1993)
 Together Wherever We Go (Sony, 1994)

References

Further reading

Articles
 "Avakian to Cut Hi-Lo's on 1st Col. Album". Billboard. December 29, 1956.
 "Hi-Lo's Exit Trend, Following Others". Billboard. December 4, 1954. 
 "Music as Written: Trend Signs Hi-Lo Combo". Billboard. January 30, 1954. 
 "The Hi-Lo's Shout Their Thanks". Billboard. December 3, 1955.
 "Hi-Lo Quartet Will Entertain at 'Y'-Day". La Habra Star. October 23, 1959.
 "Nation's Top Jazz Groups to Appear at College on Saturday". San Bernardino Sun. March 2, 1956.
 "TV Highlights: 'Disneyland Goes to the World's Fair'". San Bernardino Sun. May 17, 1964.
 Gold, Don. "'The Best Vocal Group Ever'". The Chicago Tribune. December 22, 2002.
 Grevatt, Ben. "Night Club Reviews: Basin Street East Line-Up Solid". Billboard. July 27, 1959.
 Grevatt, Ben. "Hi-Lo's Win Birdland With Oldies". Billboard. June 16, 1958.
 Grevatt, Ben. "The Hi-Lo's: Birdland, New York". Billboard. June 10, 1957.
 Hopkins, Mark W. "Precise Harmony Makes Hi-Lo's a Welcome Treat". The Milwaukee Journal. July 2, 1960.
 Lewis, Don "Easy Listening: A Hi-Lo's High". The Milwaukee Journal. July 19, 1981.
 Rolontz, Bob. "MJQ Fine But Hi-Lo's Steal Show". Billboard. February 15, 1960. 
 Sharbutt, Jay (AP). "Singers Unlimited Sounds a Lot Like the Hi-Lo's". Santa Cruz Sentinel. July 20, 1980.
 Sowa, Tom. "The Hi-Lo's Then and Now". The Spokane Spokesman-Review. November 20, 1981.

Books
Warner, Jay. "The 1950s". American Singing Groups: From 1940 to Today. Milwaukee, WI: Hal Leonard Corporation. 2006. p. 224.

External links
The Hi-Lo's at Singers.com
All About Jazz
 
 

American jazz ensembles
American vocal groups
Columbia Records artists
Musical groups established in 1953
Professional a cappella groups
Reprise Records artists
Vocal jazz ensembles